Neil Andrew Murray (born 21 February 1973 in Bellshill) is a Scottish former footballer. He began his career with Rangers in the early 1990s, and also played for clubs in Switzerland, France, Germany and England. He represented the Scotland Under-21 national team.

Early life
Murray was educated at Marr College in Troon, South Ayrshire.

Career

Playing
Murray began his career with Rangers, where he won the domestic treble in 1992/93. He left Rangers in 1996, joining Swiss club Sion and winning the Swiss League and Cup double before moving to Lorient in France a year later. He then returned to Scotland for a short spell at Dundee United, before signing for German club Mainz 05. During his two years there, he had a short loan spell in England with Grimsby Town. Murray came back Scotland permanently in 2002, signing for Falkirk before playing his final season in professional football with Ayr United.

Murray represented the Scotland national under-21 football team.

Scout and agent
Murray later worked alongside ex-Rangers player Kevin Drinkell for a sports management company. 
He also worked as a co-commentator for Setanta Sports coverage of the Bundesliga. Murray was appointed Head Scout by Rangers on 8 March 2011. He left this position 2 April 2013.

Honours

Club
Rangers
Scottish Premier Division: 1992–93, 1993–94, 1994–95, 1995–96
Scottish Cup: 1992–93
Scottish League Cup: 1992–93

Sion
National League A: 1996–97
Swiss Cup: 1996–97

International
FIFA U-16 World Championship Runner-up: 1989
World Student Games - Great Britain team - Bronze medal
UEFA U21 European Championships semi-final 1996 in Barcelona

References

External links 
 

1973 births
Living people
Scottish footballers
Scotland under-21 international footballers
Rangers F.C. players
FC Sion players
FC Lorient players
Dundee United F.C. players
1. FSV Mainz 05 players
Grimsby Town F.C. players
Falkirk F.C. players
Ayr United F.C. players
Scottish Premier League players
Scottish Football League players
English Football League players
Scottish expatriate footballers
Expatriate footballers in Switzerland
Expatriate footballers in France
Expatriate footballers in Germany
Rangers F.C. non-playing staff
Association football midfielders
People educated at Marr College